Mannvit Engineering is an engineering firm in Iceland. Mannvit offers engineering, consulting, management, operational and EPCM services to projects all over the world. Mannvit core activities include: geothermal and hydroelectric power development, geothermal district heating, infrastructure and transportation, buildings, renewable energy and climate, environmental consulting, power transmission, industry, IT and telecommunications. Company headquarters are in Kópavogur, Iceland.

History
Founded in 2008, Mannvit is the result of the merger of three long-established engineering companies that were all founded in the 1960s: Hönnun hf., VGK hf. and Rafhönnun hf.

The word 'Mannvit' is an ancient Nordic word, from the Icelandic Sagas meaning Wisdom (literally man-wits).

Management
The management team includes a CEO, two Section Managers, CFO and Human Resource Manager. This team is the head of the organizational structure which includes all engineering sectors both domestic and international. Mannvit also utilizes division managers responsible for each core discipline offered by the company.

Services
Mannvit Engineering is a consulting engineering firm that specializes in geothermal, geothermal district heating, hydroelectric, power transmission as well as other renewable energies such as wind power and environmentally-friendly processes, such as hydrogen, biofuels and biogas, anaerobic digestion, waste management, CO2 sequestration, carbon dioxide to methanol, and large scale composting. highly specialized technical expertise to service the primary aluminum industry. Additionally, in Iceland the company is involved in infrastructure projects in all fields of design and construction. These include buildings, transportation infrastructure, traffic and planning, environmental studies issues, hydrography measurements, land surveys, geology and acoustics. The company has extensive knowledge in the design of utility systems such, heating, water, data systems or sewage system. Services to these projects include planning, engineering, environmental services, procurement, construction management, project management and EPCM.  

Mannvit is a leading consultant in Environmental Impact Assessment (EIA) in Iceland for various industries and projects types, ranging from power to industry. These EIA projects include renewable energy projects, transmission, industrial- and Power-to-X projects.

Geothermal
Mannvit has participated in the development of most of the geothermal power plants in Iceland, including: Theistareykir Geothermal Power Plant, Hellisheidi Geothermal Power Plant  (Combined Heat and Power/Cogeneration/CHP), Nesjavellir Geothermal Power Plant (CHP), Krafla Geothermal Power Plant, Bjarnarflag Geothermal Power Plant, Husavik Kalina Cycle Geothermal Power Plant and the Svartsengi Geothermal Power Plant. Recent international projects include geothermal development in Hungary, Indonesia, Kenya and Ethiopia.

Hydroelectric
Mannvit has participated in numerous hydroelectric development projects in Iceland and Greenland. Examples include: Karahnjukar hydroelectric power plant in (690 MW), Vatnsfell Power Station (90MW), Búrfellsstöð hydroelectric power plant (270 MW), Hverfisfljóts small hydroelectric power station (3MW), Múlavirkjun small hydroelectric power station (6MW), Djúpadalsvirkjun small hydroelectric power station (2MW), Tasiilaq small hydroelectric plant (1.2W), Amassalik, Greenland, Qorlortorsuaq small hydroelectric power station (8MW), Greenland.

Organization

Business Units 
 Mannvit Hungary
 Mannvit Norway

Affiliated Companies
 Vatnaskil Consulting Engineers, Reykjavík, Iceland
 GTN, Geothermie Neubrandenburg GmbH, Germany
 HRV Engineering, Reykjavík, Iceland
 Loftmyndir ehf., Reykjavík, Iceland
 GTN Latin America, Chile

Partnerships
Technip – Partner for U.S. geothermal development

References

External links
 Mannvit Engineering homepage

Engineering companies of Iceland
Construction and civil engineering companies established in 2008
Renewable energy technology companies
2008 establishments in Iceland